Charles Cavilla is a Canadian politician. He was the leader of the Christian Heritage Party of Canada from the convention at Ottawa in October 1991 until March 1993. A difference of vision on leadership between Cavilla and the party board resulted in the transfer of leadership on an interim basis to Heather Stilwell. Cavilla characterized the transfer of leadership as an "illegal act." Cavilla is married to Eileen and has eight children, and fifteen grandchildren.

Electoral record

References

Living people
Christian Heritage Party of Canada leaders
Alberta candidates for Member of Parliament
Year of birth missing (living people)